Oliver Wolf Sacks  (9 July 1933 – 30 August 2015) was a British neurologist, naturalist, historian of science, and writer. Born in Britain, Sacks received his medical degree in 1958 from The Queen's College, Oxford, before moving to the United States, where he spent most of his career. He interned at Mount Zion Hospital in San Francisco and completed his residency in neurology and neuropathology at the University of California, Los Angeles (UCLA). After a fellowship at the Albert Einstein College of Medicine, he served as neurologist at Beth Abraham Hospital's chronic-care facility in the Bronx, where he worked with a group of survivors of the 1920s sleeping sickness encephalitis lethargica, who had been unable to move on their own for decades. His treatment of those patients became the basis of his 1973 book Awakenings, which was adapted into an Academy Award-nominated feature film in 1990, starring Robin Williams and Robert De Niro.

His numerous other best-selling books were mostly collections of case studies of people, including himself, with neurological disorders. He also published hundreds of articles (both peer-reviewed scientific articles and articles for a general audience), not only about neurological disorders but also insightful book reviews and articles about the history of science, natural history, and nature. His writings have been featured in a wide range of media; The New York Times called him a "poet laureate of contemporary medicine", and "one of the great clinical writers of the 20th century". His books include a wealth of narrative detail about his experiences with his patients and his own experiences, and how patients and he coped with their conditions, often illuminating how the normal brain deals with perception, memory, and individuality. In addition to the information content, the beauty of his writing style is especially treasured by many of his readers. He and his book Musicophilia: Tales of Music and the Brain were the subject of "Musical Minds", an episode of the PBS series Nova.

Sacks was appointed a CBE for services to medicine in the 2008 Birthday Honours.

He once stated that the brain is the "most incredible thing in the universe". He became widely known for writing best-selling case histories about both his patients' and his own disorders and unusual experiences, with some of his books adapted for plays by major playwrights, feature films, animated short films, opera, dance, fine art, and musical works in the classical genre.

Early life and education
Oliver Wolf Sacks was born in Cricklewood, London, England, the youngest of four children born to Jewish parents: Samuel Sacks, a Lithuanian Jewish doctor (died June 1990), and Muriel Elsie Landau, one of the first female surgeons in England (died 1972), who was one of 18 siblings. Sacks had an extremely large extended family of eminent scientists, physicians and other notable individuals, including the director and writer Jonathan Lynn and first cousins, the Israeli statesman Abba Eban the Nobel Laureate Robert Aumann

In December 1939, when Sacks was six years old, he and his older brother Michael were evacuated from London to escape the Blitz, and sent to a boarding school in the English Midlands where he remained until 1943. Unknown to his family, at the school, he and his brother Michael "...subsisted on meager rations of turnips and beetroot and suffered cruel punishments at the hands of a sadistic headmaster." This is detailed in his first autobiography, Uncle Tungsten: Memories of a Chemical Boyhood. Beginning with his return home at the age of 10, under his Uncle Dave's tutelage, he became an intensely focused amateur chemist. Later, he attended St Paul's School in London, where he developed lifelong friendships with Jonathan Miller and Eric Korn.

Study of medicine
During adolescence he shared an intense interest in biology with these friends, and later came to share his parents' enthusiasm for medicine. He chose to study medicine at university and entered The Queen's College, Oxford in 1951. The first half studying medicine at Oxford is pre-clinical, and he graduated with a Bachelor of Arts (BA) degree in physiology and biology in 1956.

Although not required, Sacks chose to stay on for an additional year to undertake research after he had taken a course by Hugh Macdonald Sinclair. Sacks recalls, "I had been seduced by a series of vivid lectures on the history of medicine and nutrition, given by Sinclair... it was the history of physiology, the ideas and personalities of physiologists, which came to life." Sacks then became involved with the school's Laboratory of Human Nutrition under Sinclair. Sacks focused his research on Jamaica ginger, a toxic and commonly abused drug known to cause irreversible nerve damage. After devoting months to research he was disappointed by the lack of help and guidance he received from Sinclair. Sacks wrote up an account of his research findings but stopped working on the subject. As a result he became depressed: "I felt myself sinking into a state of quiet but in some ways agitated despair."

His tutor at Queen's and his parents, seeing his lowered emotional state, suggested he extricate himself from academic studies for a period. His parents then suggested he spend the summer of 1955 living on Israeli kibbutz Ein HaShofet, where the physical labour would help him. Sacks would later describe his experience on the kibbutz as an "anodyne to the lonely, torturing months in Sinclair's lab". He said he lost  from his previously overweight body as a result of the healthy, hard physical labour he performed there. He spent time travelling around the country with time spent scuba diving at the Red Sea port city of Eilat, and began to reconsider his future: "I wondered again, as I had wondered when I first went to Oxford, whether I really wanted to become a doctor. I had become very interested in neurophysiology, but I also loved marine biology;... But I was 'cured' now; it was time to return to medicine, to start clinical work, seeing patients in London."

In 1956, Sacks began his clinical study of medicine at the University of Oxford and Middlesex Hospital Medical School. For the next two-and-a-half years, he took courses in medicine, surgery, orthopaedics, paediatrics, neurology, psychiatry, dermatology, infectious diseases, obstetrics, and various other disciplines. During his years as a student, he helped home-deliver a number of babies. In 1958, he graduated with Bachelor of Medicine, Bachelor of Surgery (BM BCh) degrees, and, as per tradition, his BA was promoted to a Master of Arts (MA Oxon) degree.

Having completed his medical degree, Sacks began his pre-registration house officer rotations at Middlesex Hospital the following month. "My eldest brother, Marcus, had trained at the Middlesex," he said, "and now I was following his footsteps." Before beginning his house officer post, he said he first wanted some hospital experience to gain more confidence, and took a job at a hospital in St Albans where his mother had worked as an emergency surgeon during the war. He then did his first six-month post in Middlesex Hospital's medical unit, followed by another six months in its neurological unit. He completed his pre-registration year in June 1960 but was uncertain about his future.

Beginning life in North America
Sacks left Britain and flew to Montreal, Canada, on 9 July 1960, his 27th birthday. He visited the Montreal Neurological Institute and the Royal Canadian Air Force (RCAF), telling them that he wanted to be a pilot. After some interviews and checking his background, they told him he would be best in medical research. But as he kept making mistakes, like losing data of several months of research, destroying irreplaceable slides and losing biological samples, his supervisors had second thoughts about him. Dr. Taylor, the head medical officer, told him, "You are clearly talented and we would love to have you, but I am not sure about your motives for joining." He was told to travel for a few months and reconsider. He used the next three months to travel across Canada and deep into the Canadian Rockies, which he described in his personal journal, later published as Canada: Pause, 1960.

He then made his way to the United States, completing an internship at Mt. Zion Hospital in San Francisco and a residency neurology and neuropathology at UCLA. While there, Sacks became a lifelong close friend of poet Thom Gunn, saying he loved his wild imagination, his strict control, and perfect poetic form. During much of his time at UCLA, he lived in a rented house in Topanga Canyon and experimented with various recreational drugs. He described some of his experiences in a 2012 New Yorker article, and in his book Hallucinations.  During his early career in California and New York City he indulged in:

He wrote that after moving to New York City, an amphetamine-facilitated epiphany that came as he read a book by the 19th-century migraine doctor Edward Liveing inspired him to chronicle his observations on neurological diseases and oddities; to become the "Liveing of our Time". Though he would remain a resident of the United States for the rest of his life, he never became a citizen. He told The Guardian in a 2005 interview, "In 1961, I declared my intention to become a United States citizen, which may have been a genuine intention, but I never got round to it. I think it may go with a slight feeling that this was only an extended visit. I rather like the words 'resident alien'. It's how I feel. I'm a sympathetic, resident, sort of visiting alien."

Career

Sacks served as an instructor and later clinical professor of neurology at Yeshiva University's Albert Einstein College of Medicine from 1966 to 2007, and also held an appointment at the New York University School of Medicine from 1992 to 2007. In July 2007 he joined the faculty of Columbia University Medical Center as a professor of neurology and psychiatry. At the same time he was appointed Columbia University's first "Columbia University Artist" at the university's Morningside Heights campus, recognising the role of his work in bridging the arts and sciences. He was also a visiting professor at the University of Warwick in the UK. He returned to New York University School of Medicine in 2012, serving as a professor of neurology and consulting neurologist in the school's epilepsy centre.

Sacks's work at Beth Abraham Hospital helped provide the foundation on which the Institute for Music and Neurologic Function (IMNF) is built; Sacks was an honorary medical advisor. The Institute honoured Sacks in 2000 with its first Music Has Power Award. The IMNF again bestowed a Music Has Power Award on him in 2006 to commemorate "his 40 years at Beth Abraham and honour his outstanding contributions in support of music therapy and the effect of music on the human brain and mind."

Sacks maintained a busy hospital-based practice in New York City. He accepted a very limited number of private patients, in spite of being in great demand for such consultations. He served on the boards of The Neurosciences Institute and the New York Botanical Garden.

Writing
In 1967 Sacks first began to write of his experiences with some of his neurological patients. His first such book, Ward 23, was burned by Sacks during an episode of self-doubt.<ref>{{cite book|first=Steve|last=Silberman|author-link=Steve Silberman|title=NeuroTribes: The Legacy of Autism and the Future of Neurodiversity|year=2015|isbn=978-1583334676}}</ref> His books have been translated into over 25 languages. In addition, Sacks was a regular contributor to The New Yorker, the New York Review of Books, The New York Times, London Review of Books and numerous other medical, scientific and general publications. He was awarded the Lewis Thomas Prize for Writing about Science in 2001.

Sacks's work is featured in a "broader range of media than those of any other contemporary medical author" and in 1990, The New York Times wrote he "has become a kind of poet laureate of contemporary medicine".

Sacks considered his literary style to have grown out of the tradition of 19th-century "clinical anecdotes", a literary style that included detailed narrative case histories, which he termed novelistic. He also counted among his inspirations the case histories of the Russian neuropsychologist A. R. Luria, who became a close friend through correspondence from 1973 to 1977, when Dr. Luria died.Sacks, O. (2014). Luria and "Romantic Science". In A. Yasnitsky, R. Van der Veer & M. Ferrari (Eds.), The Cambridge Handbook of cultural-historical psychology (517–528). Cambridge: Cambridge University Press After the publication of his first book Migraine in 1970, a review by his close friend W. H. Auden encouraged Sacks to adapt his writing style to "be metaphorical, be mythical, be whatever you need."

Sacks described his cases with a wealth of narrative detail, concentrating on the experiences of the patient (in the case of his A Leg to Stand On, the patient was himself). The patients he described were often able to adapt to their situation in different ways despite the fact that their neurological conditions were usually considered incurable. His book Awakenings, upon which the 1990 feature film of the same name is based, describes his experiences using the new drug levodopa on post-encephalitic patients at the former Beth Abraham Hospital, currently Beth Abraham Center for Rehabilitation and Nursing, Allerton Ave, in The Northeast Bronx, NY. Awakenings was also the subject of the first documentary made (in 1974) for the British television series Discovery. Composer and friend of Sacks, Tobias Picker, composed a ballet inspired by Awakenings for the Rambert Dance Company, which was premiered by Rambert in Salford, UK in 2010; In 2022, Picker premiered an opera of Awakenings at Opera Theatre of Saint Louis.

In his book A Leg to Stand On he wrote about the consequences of a near-fatal accident he had at age 41 in 1974, a year after the publication of Awakenings, when he fell off a cliff and severely injured his left leg while mountaineering alone above Hardangerfjord, Norway.

In some of his other books, he describes cases of Tourette syndrome and various effects of Parkinson's disease. The title article of The Man Who Mistook His Wife for a Hat describes a man with visual agnosia and was the subject of a 1986 opera by Michael Nyman. The title article of his book, An Anthropologist on Mars, which won a Polk Award for magazine reporting, is about Temple Grandin, an autistic professor. He writes in the book's preface that neurological conditions such as autism "can play a paradoxical role, by bringing out latent powers, developments, evolutions, forms of life that might never be seen, or even be imaginable, in their absence". Seeing Voices, Sacks's 1989 book, covers a variety of topics in deaf studies. The romantic drama film At First Sight (1999) was based on the essay "To See and Not See" in An Anthropologist on Mars.

In his book The Island of the Colorblind Sacks wrote about an island where many people have achromatopsia (total colourblindness, very low visual acuity and high photophobia). The second section of this book, entitled Cycad Island, describes the Chamorro people of Guam, who have a high incidence of a neurodegenerative disease locally known as lytico-bodig disease (a devastating combination of ALS, dementia and parkinsonism). Later, along with Paul Alan Cox, Sacks published papers suggesting a possible environmental cause for the disease, namely the toxin beta-methylamino L-alanine (BMAA) from the cycad nut accumulating by biomagnification in the flying fox bat.

In November 2012 Sacks's book Hallucinations was published. In it he examined why ordinary people can sometimes experience hallucinations and challenged the stigma associated with the word. He explained: "Hallucinations don't belong wholly to the insane. Much more commonly, they are linked to sensory deprivation, intoxication, illness or injury." He also considers the less well known Charles Bonnet syndrome, sometimes found in people who have lost their eyesight. The book was described by Entertainment Weekly as: "Elegant... An absorbing plunge into a mystery of the mind."

Sacks sometimes faced criticism in the medical and disability studies communities. Arthur K. Shapiro, for instance, an expert on Tourette syndrome, said Sacks's work was "idiosyncratic" and relied too much on anecdotal evidence in his writings. Researcher Makoto Yamaguchi thought Sacks's mathematical explanations, in his study of the numerically gifted savant twins (in The Man Who Mistook His Wife for a Hat), were irrelevant, and questioned Sacks's methods. Although Sacks has been characterised as a "compassionate" writer and doctor, others have felt that he exploited his subjects. Sacks was called "the man who mistook his patients for a literary career" by British academic and disability rights activist Tom Shakespeare, and one critic called his work "a high-brow freak show". Sacks responded, "I would hope that a reading of what I write shows respect and appreciation, not any wish to expose or exhibit for the thrill... but it's a delicate business."

He is also the author of The Mind's Eye, Oaxaca Journal and On the Move: A Life (his second autobiography).

Before his death in 2015 Sacks founded the Oliver Sacks Foundation, a nonprofit organization established to increase understanding of the brain through using narrative nonfiction and case histories, with goals that include publishing some of Sacks's unpublished writings, and making his vast amount of unpublished writings available for scholarly study. His first posthumous book, River of Consciousness, an anthology of his essays, was published in October 2017.  Most of the essays had been previously published in various periodicals or in science-essay-anthology books, and are no longer readily obtainable.  Sacks specified the order of his essays in River of Consciousness prior to his death.  Some of the essays focus on repressed memories and other tricks the mind plays on itself. His next posthumous book will be a collection of some of his letters. Sacks was a prolific handwritten-letter correspondent and he never communicated by e-mail.

Honours
In 1996, Sacks became a member of the American Academy of Arts and Letters (Literature). He was named a Fellow of the New York Academy of Sciences in 1999. Also in 1999, he became an Honorary Fellow at the Queen's College, Oxford. 

In 2000, Sacks received the Golden Plate Award of the American Academy of Achievement. In 2002, he became Fellow of the American Academy of Arts and Sciences (Class IV—Humanities and Arts, Section 4—Literature) and he was awarded the 2001 Lewis Thomas Prize by Rockefeller University. Sacks was also a Fellow of the Royal College of Physicians (FRCP).

Sacks was awarded honorary doctorates from Georgetown University (1990), College of Staten Island (1991), Tufts University (1991), New York Medical College (1991), Medical College of Pennsylvania (1992), Bard College (1992), Queen's University at Kingston (2001), Gallaudet University (2005), University of Oxford (2005), Pontificia Universidad Católica del Perú (2006) and Cold Spring Harbor Laboratory (2008).

Oxford University awarded him an honorary Doctor of Civil Law degree in June 2005.

Sacks received the position "Columbia Artist" from Columbia University in 2007, a post that was created specifically for him and that gave him unconstrained access to the university, regardless of department or discipline.

In 2008, Sacks was appointed Commander of the Order of the British Empire (CBE), for services to medicine, in the Queen's Birthday Honours.

The minor planet 84928 Oliversacks, discovered in 2003, was named in his honour.

In February 2010, Sacks was named as one of the Freedom From Religion Foundation's Honorary Board of distinguished achievers. He described himself as "an old Jewish atheist", a phrase borrowed from his friend Jonathan Miller.

Personal life
Sacks never married and lived alone for most of his life. He declined to share personal details until late in his life. He addressed his homosexuality for the first time in his 2015 autobiography On the Move: A Life. Celibate for about 35 years since his forties, in 2008 he began a friendship with writer and New York Times contributor Bill Hayes. Their friendship slowly evolved into a committed long-term partnership that lasted until Sacks's death; Hayes wrote about it in the 2017 memoir Insomniac City: New York, Oliver, and Me.

In Lawrence Weschler's biography, And How Are You, Dr. Sacks?, Sacks is described by a colleague as "deeply eccentric". A friend from his days as a medical resident mentions Sacks' need to violate taboos, like drinking blood mixed with milk, and how he frequently took drugs like LSD and speed in the early 1960s. Sacks himself shared personal information about how he got his first orgasm spontaneously while floating in a swimming pool, and later when he was giving a man a massage. He also admits having "erotic fantasies of all sorts" in a natural history museum he visited often in his youth, many of them about animals, like hippos in the mud.

Sacks noted in a 2001 interview that severe shyness, which he described as "a disease", had been a lifelong impediment to his personal interactions. He believed his shyness stemmed from his prosopagnosia, popularly known as "face blindness", a condition that he studied in some of his patients, including the titular man from his work The Man Who Mistook His Wife for a Hat. This neurological disability of his, whose severity and whose impact on his life Sacks did not fully grasp until he reached middle age, even sometimes prevented him from recognising his own reflection in mirrors.

Sacks swam almost daily for most of his life, beginning when his swimming-champion father started him swimming as an infant. He especially became publicly well-known for Open water swimming when he lived in the City Island section of the Bronx, as he would routinely swim around the entire island, or swim vast distances away from the island and back.

Sacks was cousin of Nobel laureate Prof. Robert Aumann.

Illness and death
Sacks underwent radiation therapy in 2006 for a uveal melanoma in his right eye. He discussed his loss of stereoscopic vision caused by the treatment, which eventually resulted in right-eye blindness, in an article and later in his book The Mind's Eye.

In January 2015 metastases from the ocular tumour were discovered in his liver. Sacks announced this development in a February 2015 New York Times op-ed piece and estimated his remaining time in "months". He expressed his intent to "live in the richest, deepest, most productive way I can". He added: "I want and hope in the time that remains to deepen my friendships, to say farewell to those I love, to write more, to travel if I have the strength, to achieve new levels of understanding and insight."

Sacks died from the disease on 30 August 2015 at his home in Manhattan at the age of 82, surrounded by his closest friends.

Bibliography

Books
 Migraine (1970) 
 Awakenings (1973) 
 A Leg to Stand On (1984) 
 The Man Who Mistook His Wife for a Hat (1985) 
 Seeing Voices: A Journey Into the World of the Deaf (1989) 
 An Anthropologist on Mars (1995)  (First ed.)
 The Island of the Colorblind (1997) 
 Uncle Tungsten: Memories of a Chemical Boyhood (2001) (first autobiography) 
 Oaxaca Journal (2002)  (travelogue of Sacks's ten-day trip with the American Fern Society to Oaxaca, Mexico, 2000)
 Musicophilia: Tales of Music and the Brain (2007) 
 The Mind's Eye (2010) 
 Hallucinations (2012) 
 On the Move: A Life (2015) (second autobiography) 
 Gratitude (2015) (published posthumously) 
 NeuroTribes: The Legacy of Autism and the Future of Neurodiversity by Steve Silberman (2015) (foreword by Sacks) 
 Oliver Sacks: The Last Interview and Other Conversations (2016)  (a collection of interviews)
 The River of Consciousness (2017) 
 Everything in Its Place: First Loves and Last Tales (2019)

Articles
 
 

Notes

References

Further reading
 Simon Callow, "Truth, Beauty, and Oliver Sacks" (review of Oliver Sacks, Everything in Its Place:  First Loves and Last Tales, Knopf, 2019, 274 pp.), The New York Review of Books, vol. LXVI, no. 10 (6 June 2019), pp. 4, 6, 8.  Oliver Sacks wrote in his public farewell in The New York Times: "Above all, I have been a sentient being, a thinking animal, on this beautiful planet, and that in itself has been an enormous privilege and adventure." (p. 8.)
 Bill Hayes: Insomniac city : New York, Oliver Sacks, and me', London ; Oxford ; New York ; New Delhi ; Sydney : Bloomsbury Publishing, 2018,

External links

 Oliver Sacks Biography and Interview on American Academy of Achievement
The Oliver Sacks Foundation

Multimedia

Archived at Ghostarchive and the Wayback Machine: 
Interview with Dempsey Rice, documentary filmmaker, about Oliver Sacks film
, a documentary film by Ric Burns

Publications

1933 births
2015 deaths
20th-century atheists
21st-century atheists
20th-century English non-fiction writers
21st-century English writers
Academics of the University of Warwick
Albert Einstein College of Medicine faculty
Alumni of The Queen's College, Oxford
British neurologists
Columbia University faculty
Commanders of the Order of the British Empire
Deaths from cancer in New York (state)
Deaths from uveal melanoma
English atheists
English expatriates in the United States
English Jews
English male non-fiction writers
English medical writers
English memoirists
English neuroscientists
English people with disabilities
Fellows of The Queen's College, Oxford
British gay writers
Jewish atheists
Jewish physicians
LGBT Jews
LGBT physicians
British LGBT scientists
English LGBT writers
Members of the American Academy of Arts and Letters
Music psychologists
New York University Grossman School of Medicine faculty
People educated at The Hall School, Hampstead
People from Cricklewood
Scientists from London
The New Yorker people
University of California, Los Angeles fellows
Writers from London
Yeshiva University faculty
English people of Lithuanian-Jewish descent
People from City Island, Bronx
Gay academics
Gay scientists
English Jewish writers
Scientists with disabilities